Alexander Baerwald (1877–1930) was a German Jewish architect best known for his work in Haifa, today in Israel, during Late Ottoman and British rule.

Life and career
Baerwald was born in Berlin, Germany on 3 March 1877. He studied at the Technical University of Berlin ("Technische Hochschule Charlottenburg", 1897–1901), interrupted by the summer semester 1898 at the Technische Hochschule of Munich. From 1903 to 1927 he was employed with the Prussian Construction and Financial Direction of Berlin, responsible for public constructions in Berlin. He advanced to become a Royal Ministerial Construction Councillor. One of his tasks was the construction management for the new building of the Prussian Royal Library in Berlin between 1908 and 1913. The building known for its Neo-Baroque architecture, following a design of the popular Wilhelmine architect :de:Ernst von Ihne and adapted by Baerwald, is now the House I of the State Library at Berlin of Prussian Cultural Heritage, at Unter den Linden street. His work in the German capital continued with the design of several other buildings in the early 1910s, including his own villa in Berlin-Dahlem (1912).

Around 1912, Baerwald moved temporarily to Ottoman Palestine, where he began work in Haifa. Baerwald is best known for designing the Technion University campus in Haifa between 1912 and 1924, for which he had been employed by the :de:Hilfsverein der deutschen Juden (lit. "German-Jewish Relief Association"). He also designed the neighbouring Beit Sefer haReali, a school preparing students for the Technion. Today the old Technion building forms part of the Israel National Museum of Science, Technology, and Space. He became a Professor of Architecture at the Technion throughout much of his later life and he made a significant contribution to the Prussian-style discipline in the country's higher education institutions.

In 1915 he built the moshav of Merchavya after his own designs. In 1924 he designed the Anglo-Palestine Bank department in Haifa, now operating as Bank Leumi le-Israel. He also designed numerous other buildings in Palestine, and by 1925 Baerwald had settled there permanently. In Palestine Baerwald was acclaimed for introducing German-style architecture for institutions of higher education. Baerwald also designed the Central Hospital in Afula (1928), and the Philips House in Haifa (1929–30), his last built project.

Alexander Baerwald died on 27 October 1930 in Haifa. He was buried at the Jewish cemetery on the Mount of Olives in Jerusalem.

Gallery

References
A Dictionary of Architecture and Landscape Architecture, Oxford University Press.
Myra Warhaftig , "Alex Baerwald", in: Sie legten den Grundstein. Leben und Wirken deutschsprachiger jüdischer Architekten in Palästina 1918–1948, Berlin and Tübingen: Wasmuth, 1996, pp. 34–41. 

19th-century German architects
19th-century German Jews
1877 births
1930 deaths
Burials at the Jewish cemetery on the Mount of Olives

Jews in Mandatory Palestine
Jewish architects
Architects from Berlin
Architects in Ottoman Palestine
Architects in Mandatory Palestine
Academic staff of Technion – Israel Institute of Technology
20th-century German architects
German emigrants to the Ottoman Empire